Boris Johnson carried out the second significant reshuffle of his majority government from 15 September to 18 September 2021, having last done so in February 2020.

Cabinet-level changes

Junior ministerial changes

Whips' Office appointments

Reaction

Demotion of Dominic Raab 

There had been growing speculation that Dominic Raab would be demoted from his position as Foreign Secretary, as a result of his handling of the Taliban offensive in August 2021. On the day of the reshuffle, Raab met with the Prime Minister for a considerable length of time, having initially refused to leave the Foreign, Commonwealth and Development Office. The Financial Times reported that Raab was "throwing his toys out of [the] pram". Sources are alleged to have told Sky News that Raab was "very angry" at Johnson's decision to move him. Eventually, Raab accepted his new position as Secretary of State for Justice and was given the additional role of Deputy Prime Minister, making him the first minister to hold the office since Nick Clegg during the Conservative–Liberal Democrat coalition (2010–2015).

Appointment of Nadine Dorries 
The appointment of Nadine Dorries as Culture Secretary was heavily criticised in the arts and culture sectors. Her promotion to the Cabinet was questioned due to her right-wing views and inexperience Dorries was dubbed by some as the new "Secretary of State for Culture Wars", with concerns raised about her extreme views on cultural issues. Following her appointment, the Broadcasting, Entertainment, Communications and Theatre Union called on the new minister to "focus more on supporting our cultural industries and less on stoking divisive culture wars".

Notable dismissals 
After Robert Buckland was dismissed as Secretary of State for Justice and replaced by Dominic Raab, there was some criticism from Sir Bob Neill, chairman of the Justice Select Committee. Neill told Sky News that removing Buckland from his position was "unjust, outrageous" and that he had been "shabbily treated" by Johnson. Derek Sweeting, chairman of the Bar Council, appeared to criticise the turnover of justice secretaries, stating: "As we welcome the eighth justice secretary in the last 10 years to play this vital role, the need for a consistent and strong voice in government for our justice system could not be greater".

Alix Culbertson wrote that Gavin Williamson's sacking was of "little surprise" following his handling of GCSE grades. He was also criticised for confusing rugby player Maro Itoje with Marcus Rashford. Wes Streeting responded to reports that Williamson had been  ‘tipped for knighthood’ saying "there should be no rewards for failure." On 24 September 2021, Williamson unfollowed Boris Johnson on Instagram.

Later changes 
In December 2021, Wendy Morton and Chris Heaton-Harris swapped ministerial jobs (Minister of State for Europe and Minister of State for Transport).

See also 
Second Johnson ministry
Premiership of Boris Johnson
List of departures from the second Johnson ministry
2021 in politics and government

Notes

References 

Cabinet reshuffles in the United Kingdom
Boris Johnson
September 2021 events in the United Kingdom
2021 in British politics